Olabisi ("Bisi") Afolabi (born 31 October 1975 in Ilorin) is a retired female track and field athlete from Nigeria, who specialized in the 400 metres during her career. She was a member of the Nigerian team that won the silver medal in the 1996 Olympics 4 x 400 metres relay.

She won the World Junior Championships in 1994. She also has a silver medal from the 1999 All-Africa Games and a bronze medal from the 1995 All-Africa Games.

She is now married and has children.

Competition record

External links

sports-reference

1975 births
Nigerian female sprinters
Olympic athletes of Nigeria
Olympic silver medalists for Nigeria
Athletes (track and field) at the 1996 Summer Olympics
Athletes (track and field) at the 2000 Summer Olympics
Athletes (track and field) at the 1994 Commonwealth Games
Athletes (track and field) at the 2002 Commonwealth Games
Commonwealth Games bronze medallists for Nigeria
Living people
People from Ilorin
Commonwealth Games medallists in athletics
Olympic silver medalists in athletics (track and field)
African Games gold medalists for Nigeria
African Games medalists in athletics (track and field)
African Games silver medalists for Nigeria
African Games bronze medalists for Nigeria
Universiade medalists in athletics (track and field)
Athletes (track and field) at the 1995 All-Africa Games
Athletes (track and field) at the 1999 All-Africa Games
Athletes (track and field) at the 2003 All-Africa Games
Universiade gold medalists for Nigeria
Universiade bronze medalists for Nigeria
Medalists at the 1996 Summer Olympics
Medalists at the 1993 Summer Universiade
Medalists at the 1995 Summer Universiade
Olympic female sprinters
20th-century Nigerian women
Medallists at the 2002 Commonwealth Games